Herman Johannes Timme (21 July 1933 – 19 December 2022) was a Dutch decathlete. He competed at the 1960 Summer Olympics and finished in 15th place. Between 1957 and 1967 Timme won more than 20 medals at national championships, but never a national title. He retired from competitions in 1970.

Timme died on 19 December 2022, at the age of 89.

References

External links
Meerkamp Mannen Periode 1945–1972. atletiekhistorici.nl

1933 births
2022 deaths
Athletes (track and field) at the 1960 Summer Olympics
Dutch decathletes
Dutch male discus throwers
Dutch male shot putters
Olympic athletes of the Netherlands
Athletes from Rotterdam